Wadwicz is a Polish coat of arms. It was used by several szlachta families in the times of the Polish–Lithuanian Commonwealth.

History

A knight called Wadwicz was dispatched twice in a delegation by King Boleslaw Krywousty or "Wrymouth," 1102-1138.  While returning the second time this knight was plunged into the depths during a storm at sea, and he drowned. In reward for his services King Boleslaw bestowed this shield upon his successors.

Blazon

Notable bearers

Notable bearers of this coat of arms include:

Jan Mężyk z Dąbrowy
Pietrasz Montygerdowicz
Adam Naruszewicz

See also
 Polish heraldry
 Heraldry
 Coat of arms

References

Polish coats of arms